Now and Again is an American science fiction comedy-drama television series created by Glenn Gordon Caron that aired from September 24, 1999 until May 5, 2000 on CBS. The story revolves around the United States government engineering the perfect human body for use in espionage, but not being able to perfect the brain. In an attempt to get the project up and running, they take the brain of overweight family man Michael Wiseman, who is killed in a train accident.

Given a new life, Michael is kept in an apartment where he is trained by government experts, led by Dr. Theodore Morris, in the art of espionage. Despite his new life and new abilities, Michael longs to return to his wife Lisa and daughter Heather, who are themselves discovering that not all is as it seems with Michael's death.

Plot
Michael Wiseman (John Goodman in the pilot and flashbacks, and subsequently Eric Close) lives in suburban New York with his wife Lisa (Margaret Colin) and daughter Heather (Heather Matarazzo) and works as an executive at an insurance company.  When passed over for a promotion, Michael and his friend and co-worker Roger (Gerrit Graham) go out drinking after work.  While standing on the subway platform heading home that night, Michael is accidentally knocked off the platform directly into the path of an oncoming train.  When he awakes, he sees Dr. Theodore Morris (Dennis Haysbert), the head of a top secret government project to artificially engineer the perfect human body. Unable to create a brain from scratch, Dr. Morris has rescued Michael's brain from his dead body and implanted it in the engineered body.  The process allows Michael Wiseman to continue to live, but also forces him to work as an experiment for Dr. Morris and occasionally help fight terrorists.  Because of the top-secret nature of the project, Michael is told he may never have contact again with his wife or daughter, under penalty of his own death and the death of anyone he tells of his existence. Despite the threat, Michael finds ways to contact his family while keeping his true identity a secret.

Over the course of the series, Dr. Morris continues to experiment on Michael, testing the limits of his abilities and strength.  Michael is occasionally used to complete secret missions or foil criminal activity.  Lisa and Heather find themselves running out of money because the insurance company refuses to pay on Michael's policy, leading Lisa to become a realtor.

Characters

Main
 Michael Wiseman (Eric Close), an insurance executive who was killed in an accident; his brain has been implanted into a genetically-engineered body.
 John Goodman plays Michael in both pilot and flashbacks
 Dr. Theodore Morris (Dennis Haysbert), the head of the top secret government project to engineer a human being
 Lisa Wiseman (née Slegermelge) (Margaret Colin), Michael's housewife widow who must learn to move on with life after her husband's death
 Heather Wiseman (Heather Matarazzo), Michael's teenage daughter
 Roger Bender (Gerrit Graham), Michael's best friend and fellow executive at the insurance company

Recurring
 The Eggman (Kim Chan), a terrorist who uses eggs to contain a deadly poisonous gas
 Gerald Misenbach (Chip Zien), a lawyer who represents Lisa in dealing with Michael's insurance company, and later a potential suitor
 Craig Spence (Chad Lowe), Michael's scheming and corrupt boss at the insurance company who is dead-set against paying on Michael's policy
 Special Agent #1 (Mike Henry), Dr. Morris' right-hand man
 Ruth Bender (Christine Baranski), Roger's never-seen wife

Notable guest stars
 In the first episode and flashback scenes in later episodes, John Goodman played Michael Wiseman in his original body.
 Reiko Aylesworth appeared as Dr. Taylor, a physical therapist for Michael Wiseman, sent to test his romantic attachment to his former wife.
 Mick Foley appeared in the final episode as the Eggman's cellmate, and assists in the Eggman's escape from prison.
 Ian Somerhalder appeared as Brian in the episode "A Girl's Life".
 Mark Margolis appeared as Nicky Vordogov in the episode "Pulp Turkey".

In addition, beginning with episode 10, Charles Durning was heard reading a brief narration at the beginning of each episode summarizing the show's backstory.

Production and broadcast
The show ran for one season. Airing on Friday nights, the show received only fair ratings. The reasons cited by CBS for its cancellation included the unjustifiable expense of the program and the low ratings.

Episodes

Home media
In 2014, CBS DVD released Now and Again: The DVD Edition on region 1 DVD in the US.  The 5-disc set features all 22 episodes of the series, two featurettes and a nearly two-hour long retrospective documentary. These include interviews and full participation from almost all of the leading cast and crew, bar John Goodman. According to the packaging the "music has been changed for this home entertainment version."

In 2016, an identical set was released on region 4 DVD in Australia by Via Vision Entertainment (VVE), though it was slightly retitled Now and Again: The Complete Series.

Awards

In 2000 Now and Again won three Saturn Awards for:
 Best Genre TV Actress – Margaret Colin
 Best Genre TV Supporting Actor – Dennis Haysbert
 Best Network Television Series

Now and Again was also nominated for an Emmy in 2000 for Outstanding Main Title Design.

References

External links
 

CBS original programming
1990s American comedy-drama television series
1990s American comic science fiction television series
2000s American comedy-drama television series
2000s American comic science fiction television series
1999 American television series debuts
2000 American television series endings
Television series by CBS Studios
Saturn Award-winning television series